Darling Harbour ferry wharf may refer to the following, all located in Darling Harbour, in Sydney, Australia:
 Aquarium ferry wharf
 Barangaroo ferry wharf
 King Street Wharf
 Pyrmont Bay ferry wharf